Bojović is a Serbian surname. It may refer to:

Petar Bojović (1858–1945), Serbian general
Milan Bojović (born 1987), Serbian football player
Mijuško Bojović (born 1988), Montenegrin footballer
Vidan Bojović (born 1979), Serbian futsal player who plays for Ekonomac Kragujevac and the Serbia national futsal team ...
Zoran Bojović (born 1956), retired Montenegrin football midfielder
Miljana Bojović (born 1987), Serbian female basketball player
Miloš Bojović (born 1981), Serbian professional basketball player
Miloš Bojović (1938–2001), Serbian professional basketball player
Ivan Bojović (born 1977), retired Montenegrin football defender
Dejan Bojović (born 1983), Serbian volleyball player
Vlado Bojović (born 1952), former Yugoslav handball player
Biljana Petrović née Bojović (born 1961), retired Yugoslavian high jumper
Zoran Bojovic (architect), architect
Bane Bojović, founding member of rapcore band Sunshine
The Bojović brotherhood of the Vasojevići

See also
Bojić

Serbian surnames